The 2009 British Supersport Championship was the twenty-second running of the British Supersport Championship. The top two runners in the 2008 championship, Glen Richards and Ian Lowry both moved up to the British Superbike Championship, with HM Plant Honda and Relentless Suzuki respectively. Steve Plater and the returning Billy McConnell were early season contenders for the championship, with Plater eventually going on to claim the championship at the final round, at Oulton Park.

Calendar

Entry list

Season standings

Rider's standings

References

External links 
 The official website of the British Supersport Championship

Supersport
2009 in Supersport racing
British Supersport Championship